David McWilliams Ludlum (December 3, 1910 – May 23, 1997) was an American historian, meteorologist, entrepreneur, and author. He was the founder of the only magazine in the U.S. about weather, Weatherwise.

Selected works 
Ludlum published dozens of books in his lifetime. Here are a few:
 Social Ferment in Vermont, 1791-1850
 Early American Winters, 1604-1820
  Early American Winters II, 1821-1870
 Early American Hurricanes, 1492-1870
 Early American Tornadoes, 1586-1870
 American Weather Book
 Weather Record Book
 The Weather Factor
 National Audubon Society Field Guide to North American Weather
 Weatherwise magazine

See also 
 Thomas P. Grazulis
 Snowden D. Flora
 José Carlos Millás

References

Further reading

External links 
 https://web.archive.org/web/20051124014435/http://www.weathernotebook.org/transcripts/1997/10/16.html
 http://www.airweaassn.org/news/98newslet.htm#memoriam

American meteorologists
Princeton University alumni
University of California, Berkeley alumni
United States Army Air Forces officers
1910 births
1997 deaths
Writers from East Orange, New Jersey
20th-century American historians
American male non-fiction writers
Historians from New Jersey
20th-century American male writers
Military personnel from New Jersey